Onsjö is a suburban village in Vänersborg in the Vänersborg Municipality in Västra Götaland County, Sweden.

It is located south of Karl's grave. 
There is a church,  and  Onsjö golf course.

References

Populated places in Vänersborg Municipality
Populated places in Västra Götaland County